Nakhon Lampang railway station is a railway station in Sop Tui Subdistrict, Mueang Lampang District, Lampang Province. It is the main railway station for the province and is operated by the State Railway of Thailand (SRT). The station is on the Northern Line,  from Bangkok railway station. The station was built around 1915 and was open for use after the first royal train arrived at Lampang station on 1 April 1916.

Architecture 
The station building was built in a mix of northern Thai-styled architecture and European architecture and has two floors. The upper floor is the office of the Lampang District Traffic Department, and the lower floor is the station office. The balcony fence of the upper floor, door frames, and windows are decorated, and the entrance to the lower hall and ticket office have curved entrances.

Nakhon Lampang railway station has been well maintained over the years, retaining its many decorative features. The station received the Association of Siamese Architects' Architectural Conservation Award under the category of institutional and public structures in 1993.

In front of the station on display is steam locomotive no. 728 and a fountain. There is also a horse rickshaw stop as well.

Train services 
 Special Express Uttarawithi 9 Bangkok–Chiang Mai
 Special Express Uttarawithi 12 Chiang Mai–Bangkok
 Special Express 13/14 Bangkok–Chiang Mai–Bangkok
 Express 51/52 Bangkok–Chiang Mai–Bangkok
 Rapid 102 Chiang Mai–Bangkok
 Rapid 109 Bangkok–Chiang Mai
 Local 407/408 Nakhon Sawan–Chiang Mai–Nakhon Sawan

Annual event 
Every April, there is a commemorative event to celebrate the railway's history and horse rickshaws, a symbol of Lampang.

Places nearby 
 Wat Sri Rong Muang
 Bo Haeo Community

Bo Haeo Halt 

Bo Haeo Railway Halt was a halt operated by the State Railway of Thailand, in Bo Haeo Subdistrict, Mueang Lampang District. It used to be between Nakhon Lampang and Hang Chat railway stations.

Gallery

References 

 
 
 #
 
 

Buildings and structures in Lampang province
Railway stations in Thailand
Railway stations opened in 1916